The 2001 Ansett Australia Cup was contested by all sixteen clubs of the Australian Football League prior to the beginning of the AFLs 2001 season. It ran for five weeks in February and March 2001. The competition took a round-robin format to provide all teams with at least 3 practice games to prepare for the 2001 regular season, with all clubs divided into four groups of four, and the group winners qualifying for the knockout semi finals.

The win over  that secured  a place in the semi finals was marred however by a serious broken leg suffered by key ruckman Brendon Lade. In Group B,  won their place in the semi finals after a 28-point win in the final group game against . Group C was won by  after they defeated  by 13 points in the deciding game of the group.

In the knockout semi finals,  and  beat  and  respectively to qualify for the Grand Final.  trailed  at 3/4 time but kicked the first 5 goals of the final term to secure a 16-point victory in front of their own fans at Football Park. In the other semi final at Colonial Stadium, the  kicked the final 4 goals of the game against  to win by 15 points.

Group stage

Group 1

Group 2

|- bgcolor="#CCCCFF"
|Home team||Home team score||Away team||Away team score||Ground||Date||Crowd
|- bgcolor="#FFFFFF"
|  || 12.14 (86) ||  || 10.8 (68) || Colonial Stadium || Friday, 16 February || 30,072
|- bgcolor="#FFFFFF"
|  || 6.11 (47) ||  || 14.12 (96) || Subiaco Oval || Friday, 16 February || 16,905
|- bgcolor="#FFFFFF"
|  || 14.12 (96) ||  || 12.9 (81) || Manuka Oval || Saturday, 24 February || 8157
|- bgcolor="#FFFFFF"
|  || 12.6 (78) ||  || 12.8 (80) || Subiaco Oval || Saturday, 24 February || 16,090
|- bgcolor="#FFFFFF"
|  || 19.9 (123) ||  || 15.7 (97) || Colonial Stadium || Friday, 2 March || 8642
|- bgcolor="#FFFFFF"
|  || 18.12 (120) ||  || 14.8 (92) || Colonial Stadium || Saturday, 3 March || 28,983

Group 3

|- bgcolor="#CCCCFF"
|Home team||Home team score||Away team||Away team score||Ground||Date||Crowd
|- bgcolor="#FFFFFF"
|  || 10.13 (73) ||  || 16.18 (114) || Westpac Stadium || Saturday, 17 February || 8000
|- bgcolor="#FFFFFF"
|  || 14.8 (92) ||  || 16.10 (106) || Colonial Stadium || Saturday, 17 February || 15,815
|- bgcolor="#FFFFFF"
|  || 10.12 (72) ||  || 9.12 (66) || Optus Oval || Saturday, 24 February || 7291
|- bgcolor="#FFFFFF"
|  || 5.15 (45) ||  || 9.7 (61) || Bundaberg Rum Stadium || Saturday, 24 February || 5800
|- bgcolor="#FFFFFF"
|  || 11.11 (77) ||  || 9.5 (59) || Football Park || Friday, 2 March || 20,169
|- bgcolor="#FFFFFF"
|  || 10.14 (74) ||  || 9.7 (61) || Gabba || Saturday, 3 March || 22,957

Group 4

|- bgcolor="#CCCCFF"
|Home team||Home team score||Away team||Away team score||Ground||Date||Crowd
|- bgcolor="#FFFFFF"
|  || 8.9 (57) ||  || 14.14 (98) || Subiaco Oval || Saturday, 17 February || 11,392
|- bgcolor="#FFFFFF"
|  || 13.11 (89) ||  || 6.9 (45) || York Park || Sunday, 18 February || 13,958
|- bgcolor="#FFFFFF"
|  || 14.13 (97) ||  || 9.11 (65) || Optus Oval || Sunday, 25 February || 7875
|- bgcolor="#FFFFFF"
|  || 10.12 (72) ||  || 5.16 (46) || Subiaco Oval || Sunday, 25 February || 9193
|- bgcolor="#FFFFFF"
|  || 22.13 (145) ||  || 7.9 (51) || Optus Oval || Sunday, 4 March || 4391
|- bgcolor="#FFFFFF"
|  || 21.17 (143) ||  || 6.7 (43) || Colonial Stadium || Sunday, 4 March || 9813

Knockout Phase

Semi-finals

Grand final

Knockout Chart

See also

List of VFL/AFL pre-season and night series premiers
2001 AFL season

References

External links
Footy news Report on the final round of Ansett Cup Group Matches
Footy news Report on the 2 Ansett Cup Semi-finals
Footy news Report on the Ansett Cup Grand Final

2001 Australian Football League season
NAB Cup
Australian Football League pre-season competition